Oluwatobi Feyisara Ajibolade, known professionally as Tobi (stylized as TOBi), is a Nigerian born Canadian rapper and singer signed to RCA Records and Same Plate Entertainment. He released his debut studio album Still in May 2019 and his second album Elements Vol. 1 in 2020.

Early life and education
Oluwatobi Feyisara Ajibolade was born in 1993 in Lagos, Nigeria and moved to Ottawa, Canada with his father when he was 9 years old. He first began writing lyrics and poetry around that time. Ajibolade grew up largely in Brampton, Ontario, a suburb of Toronto. As a teenager, he engaged in rap battles, including one with a pre-fame Tory Lanez. He later attended Wilfrid Laurier University where he studied biology and psychology.

Career
Around 2015, Ajibolade began releasing music using the stage name, "Tobi Aji". In 2016, he began using the moniker, "Tobi" (stylized as TOBi), and independently released an EP titled, FYI. The collection featured the songs, "Indecisions" and "Deeper". A music video for the latter song was released in November 2016. The following month, Tobi released the single, "Libra".

In September 2017, he released the song, "Hidden Fences", which appeared on an episode of the HBO series, Insecure. Another song, "January December", was released in January 2018. Beginning in 2019, Tobi began releasing several new tracks, including "City Blues", "Sweet Poison", and "Werking". Those three songs served as the singles for Tobi's debut studio album, Still, released in May 2019 by RCA Records and Same Plate Entertainment. The album also featured a guest appearance from VanJess on the track, "Come Back Home". A deluxe edition of the album, Still+, was released in April 2020 and included two new songs ("Paid" and "Holiday") and three new remixes. Still+ had guest appearances from The Game, Shad, Haviah Mighty, Kemba, Jazz Cartier, and Ejji Smith.

In October 2020, Tobi released his second studio album, Elements Vol. 1. It won the 2021 Juno Award for Rap Recording of the Year, with "Holiday" being nominated for Contemporary R&B/Soul Recording of the Year. The music video for his song "24 (Toronto Remix)", directed by Kit Weyman, was longlisted for the 2021 Prism Prize.

In January 2021, he was named one of the winners of SOCAN's inaugural Black Canadian Music Awards alongside Dylan Sinclair, Naya Ali, RAAHiiM and Hunnah.

Elements Vol. 1 was shortlisted for the 2021 Polaris Music Prize.

In 2023, he participated in an all-star recording of Serena Ryder's single "What I Wouldn't Do", which was released as a charity single to benefit Kids Help Phone's Feel Out Loud campaign for youth mental health.

Artistry
In an interview with Afropunk, Tobi cited the work of Gil Scott-Heron, Frank Ocean, Marvin Gaye, Eartha Kitt, Florence and the Machine, and Andre 3000 as inspirations for his own work, particularly his lyrics.

Discography

Studio albums

Extended plays

Singles

References

Nigerian emigrants to Canada
Nigerian male rappers
RCA Records artists
Sony Music artists
Rappers from Toronto
Canadian male rappers
21st-century Canadian rappers
Canadian contemporary R&B singers
1993 births
Living people
Juno Award for Rap Recording of the Year winners
21st-century Canadian male musicians